Alyaksandr Novik (born 15 October 1994) is a Belarusian professional footballer.

References

External links 
 
 

1994 births
Living people
People from Byaroza
Belarusian footballers
Association football defenders
Belarusian expatriate footballers
Expatriate footballers in Poland
FC Dinamo Minsk players
FC Kobrin players
FC Bereza-2010 players
FC Dynamo Brest players
Kotwica Kołobrzeg footballers
FC Slonim-2017 players
FC Smorgon players
FC Torpedo-BelAZ Zhodino players
FC Belshina Bobruisk players
FC Naftan Novopolotsk players
Sportspeople from Brest Region